Oleksandr Mykolayovych Babiy (born 9 July 1968 in Tashkent) is a Ukrainian retired professional footballer. He made his professional debut in the Soviet Second League B in 1991 for FC Temp Shepetivka. He played 2 games in the UEFA Cup 1999–2000 for FC Zenit Saint Petersburg.

Honours
 Ukrainian Premier League runner-up: 1997, 1998.
 Ukrainian Cup winner: 1995, 1997.
 Russian Cup winner: 1999.

References

1968 births
Living people
Soviet footballers
Ukrainian footballers
Ukrainian expatriate footballers
Russian Premier League players
Ukrainian Premier League players
FC Shakhtar Donetsk players
FC Metalurh Zaporizhzhia players
FC Zenit Saint Petersburg players
FC Lokomotiv Nizhny Novgorod players
Sportspeople from Tashkent
Uzbekistani people of Ukrainian descent
Expatriate footballers in Russia
FC Arsenal Tula players
Association football defenders
Ukrainian expatriate sportspeople in Russia